Mesbah Uddin is a Bangladesh Awami League politician and the former Member of Parliament of Chandpur-1.

Career
Uddin was elected to parliament from Chandpur-1 as a Bangladesh Awami League candidate in 1991.

References

Awami League politicians
2006 deaths
5th Jatiya Sangsad members
Year of birth missing